During the 2005–06 English football season, Millwall F.C. competed in the Football League Championship.

Season summary
Former Watford, Wolverhampton Wanderers and Walsall manager Colin Lee replaced Steve Claridge as manager of Millwall, but lasted only five months in charge. On 21 December, with the club bottom of the Championship, he became the club's director of football (he would leave the club altogether in February) and was replaced as manager by 32-year-old player Dave Tuttle, who had no previous experience in management, on a short-term contract until the end of the season. Millwall experienced a very difficult season and their relegation to League One was confirmed on 17 April with a 2–0 loss against Southampton. Tuttle resigned three days later. Goalkeeping coach Tony Burns and former Millwall manager Alan McLeary took charge for the two remaining games of the season.

Final league table

Results
Millwall's score comes first

Legend

Football League Championship

FA Cup

League Cup

Players

First-team squad
Squad at end of season

Left club during season

Reserve squad

Notes

References

Millwall F.C. seasons
Millwall